Giovanni Paolo Pisani (1574-1637) was an Italian painter, active mainly in a Mannerist style in Siena. Paintings can be found in the churches of San Sebastiano in Vallepiatta and Santo Spirito.

References

1574 births
1637 deaths
Mannerist painters
16th-century Italian painters
Italian male painters
17th-century Italian painters
Painters from Siena